Richard Spooner may refer to:

Richard Spooner (MP) (1783–1864), British Member of Parliament and businessman
Richard Spooner (equestrian), American show jumping rider
Richard T. Spooner (born 1925), former United States Marine Corps officer
Dick Spooner (Richard Thompson Spooner, 1919–1997), English cricketer